Sulfamide (IUPAC name: sulfuric diamide) is an organosulfur compound with the chemical formula  and structure . Sulfamide is produced by the reaction of sulfuryl chloride with ammonia.
Sulfamide was first prepared in 1838 by the French chemist Henri Victor Regnault.

Sulfamide functional group
In organic chemistry, the term sulfamide may also refer to the functional group which consists of at least one organic group attached to a nitrogen atom of sulfamide.

Symmetric sulfamides can be prepared directly from amines, sulfur dioxide gas and an oxidant:    

In this example, the reactants are aniline, triethylamine (Et = ethyl group), and iodine.

The sulfamide functional group is an increasingly common structural feature used in medicinal chemistry.

See also
 Sulfamic acid
 Sulfonamide (chemistry)

References

Sulfuryl compounds
Inorganic nitrogen compounds